Walshaw Dean Reservoirs are three reservoirs situated above Hebden Bridge, West Yorkshire, England.
They are between Hebden Bridge and Top Withins, a ruined farmhouse near Haworth, the reputed inspiration for "Wuthering Heights" in the novel of the same name by Emily Brontë.

The reservoirs' catchments are dominated by peatland habitats. The reservoirs drain into the Calder Valley.

On 19 May 1989 Walshaw Dean Lodge entered the UK Weather Records with the Highest 120-min total rainfall at 193 mm; however, the Met Office expresses 'reservations' about this record.

History 
To cope with the growing population of Halifax, construction of the reservoirs was put out to tender by Halifax Corporation.

To house the navvies working on construction a temporary shanty town named Dawson City was built, with a narrow-gauge railway, Blake Dean Railway, to transport navvies and construction materials to the sites of the reservoirs.

Access 
The reservoirs are on the Pennine Way.

References

External links 

Geography of Calderdale
Reservoirs in West Yorkshire